"Memory" is a song by American country music singer Kane Brown and American musician Blackbear. It was released on July 9, 2021. The song was written by Brown, Ernest Keith Smith, Joe Kirkland, Andrew Goldstein and Blackbear, who also produced with latter.

Background
"Memory" is a pop ballad that reflects on Brown and Blackbear's vices, including drugs and alcohol, and the anxieties of fame.

In WHTZ's interview, Brown said: "This song to me is going to go a bunch of different ways for people, it's kind of like a happy depression song..... It's just an uplifting song to find out you're not the only one."

Music video
The music video was released on July 9, 2021. The singers play astronauts in the video, singing the song from the surface of the moon as well as inside a spaceship.

Charts

Weekly charts

Year-end charts

Certifications

Release history

References

2021 songs
2021 singles
Kane Brown songs
Blackbear (musician) songs
Songs written by Kane Brown
Songs written by Blackbear (musician)
Songs written by Andrew Goldstein (musician)
Songs written by Ernest (musician)
RCA Records Nashville singles
Country pop songs
Pop ballads